Yuhua Secondary School (YHSS) is a co-educational government school in Jurong West, Singapore which offers the Express, Normal (Academic) and Normal (Technical) streams. It was founded in 1986.

History

Yuhua Secondary School
The school began operations in 1986. In the 1990s, the school was well known for its hockey team.

From 2013 to 2014, the school was upgraded under the Programme for Rebuilding and Improving Existing Schools scheme. Under the upgrade, an auditorium, barrier-free access and an indoor sports hall were added. Since 2019, the school has absorbed Shuqun Secondary School.

Shuqun Secondary School

Shuqun Secondary School (SQSS) is a government secondary school in Jurong East established in 1925. Shuqun Secondary School was moved to Jurong East in 1985 from the old village at former Old Jurong Road. Shuqun Secondary School underwent Programme for Rebuilding and Improving Existing Schools / PRIME in 2009.

Mr N Sivarajan took over as the principal in 2016.

Shuqun Secondary School was one of the three secondary schools that merged with other secondary schools in 2019. Shuqun Secondary School merged with Yuhua Secondary School on the site of Yuhua Secondary School.

Identity and culture

School Crest
The school crest of Yuhua Secondary consists of a letter Y and a letter H interweaved together, representing the strength in unity and effort exemplified by the school in pursuing excellence. The letters are made out of broad and narrow lines, signifying the many paths students of the school can take to achieve success.

School's Concert Band 
Yuhua Secondary School concert band is a CCA which has been a strong stay of the school since the 1980s. The concert band has also participated in the 2018 National Day Parade.

Curriculum
The school offers three academic streams to its students – the Express, Normal (Academic) and Normal (Technical) courses. The Express course consists of a four-year scheme preceding the Singapore-Cambridge GCE Ordinary Level examinations, while both the
Normal (Academic) and Normal (Technical) streams consist of a scheme over the same duration that culminates in the Singapore-Cambridge GCE Normal Level examination. Those in the Normal (Academic) course also have the option to continue one more year to the GCE Ordinary Level examination after completing their GCE Normal Level examinations.

The school also offers a music programme known as Music Empowered Learners, Our Dynamic Yuhuans (MELODY). According to the school, this programme allows students to delve into different forms of music, as well as to show off their musical skills. Since 2016, the school has also offered the Enhanced Music Programme to its students and also Electronics as a new O Level Subject. There are also addition of new subjects for N Level students.

Co-curricular activities
Yuhua Secondary offers a total of 18 extra-curricular activities (−1 after merger), labelled as co-curricular activities (CCAs) by the Ministry of Education. These include sports, performing arts, clubs as well as uniformed groups. Several of these have managed to perform well for their school over the years.

The school's concert band has been awarded Certificates of Distinction for the Singapore Youth Festival ever since the method of judging was changed to the Arts Presentation Assessment in 2012. The school's Chinese dance troupe has also attained Certificates of Distinction and Accomplishment over the same period of time.

Uniformed Groups: National Cadet Corps (NCC), National Police Cadet Corps (NPCC), National Civil Defence Cadet Corps (NCDCC), Boys Brigade

Sports: Tchoukball, Volleyball, Floorball, Football, Wushu

Performing Arts: Choir, Dance, Concert Band, Stagewright, Harmonica Band

Clubs and Societies: Media Resource Library, Tinkering and Robotics Club, Chinese Literacy Drama and Debate Society (CLDDS), Inforcomm and Media Club.

References 

Educational institutions established in 1986
1986 establishments in Singapore
Jurong West
Secondary schools in Singapore